The following properties are listed on the National Register of Historic Places in Arlington, Massachusetts.

Listings

|}

See also
National Register of Historic Places listings in Middlesex County, Massachusetts for listings in neighboring Belmont and Lexington
National Register of Historic Places listings in Winchester, Massachusetts
National Register of Historic Places listings in Cambridge, Massachusetts
National Register of Historic Places listings in Medford, Massachusetts

References

Arlington, Massachusetts
Arlington
 
Arlington, Massachusetts